Charities Directorate of Canada is part of the Federal Ministry of National Revenue, and is responsible for reviewing the applications for charity registration, and auditing and maintaining accountability through education and responsible enforcement. They work to count and monitor the registered charities operating in Canada in the fairest way possible.
As of December 2014, there were 86,193 charities registered in the directorate.
The Directorate is located in Ottawa, in the Canadian Revenue Agency offices.

Charity status

Definition 
To gain charity status, organizations must first register with the federal Canadian Revenue Agency under the Income Tax Act. To be eligible for charitable tax status, charities need to provide a public benefit, such as poverty relief or education, and they are limited in their business and political activities, including making profit or engaging in partisan behavior. These limitations are to ensure charities keep to their primary goals and don't abuse their special status.

Benefits  
Charitable status grants organizations exemption from income tax and provides the power to issue donation receipts, eligibility to receive gifts from fellow registered charities, and exempts goods and services provided by the charity from sales tax.

Special donor status 
Certain donees have the ability to issue their own donation receipts like the Registered Canadian Amateur athletic association (RCAAA), foreign charities accepting gifts from her Majesty the Queen, universities outside of Canada and the United Nations.

Obligations 
Registered charities have obligations linked to the status: they must devote and maintain control and direction of all of their resources while keeping them aligned with their purpose, they must file their T3010 Registered Charity Information Return annually, keep reliable records and books of activities, and they must maintain their status as a Canadian legal entity.

Political action 
There are limitations as to how registered charities can intervene in political affairs. Political activities must be coordinated or subordinate to the charity's purpose, in no way partisan, and they must provide records of expenses related to such activities in their T3010 forms. The Directorate defines political activities as encouraging and mobilizing the public to try to change specific public policy, law or government decisions, or to engage in partisan activities. Public awareness and education are considered acceptable by the Canada Revenue Agency, as long as the information is sound and the content is not overly emotive. Public policy dialogue and development activities by charities (PPDDAs) by poverty relief, education, or religious organizations reinforce the charity's purpose if they are related to its stated purpose and provide a benefit to the public (see Policy statement CPS-024, Guidelines for registering a charity: Meeting the public benefit test)”.

Legislation

Establishing Law 
The Charities Directorate of the Canadian Revenue Agency is delegated authority by the Minister of National Revenue to enforce provisions on registered charities and qualified donees under the Canadian Income Tax Act.

Activities of the Directorate

Ensuring Compliance
The Charities Directorate is responsible for federal regulations on registered charities in Canada under the Income Tax Act, particularly compliance with information reporting requirements to maintain transparency and public accountability (Prime Minister mandate letter to relevant minister:. To enable compliance with the Income Tax Act, registered charities must issue donation receipts for individual and corporate donations and are required to file annual tax returns. Compliance measures include education letters; compliance agreements, sanctions, including financial penalties; suspension of charities’ tax-receipting privileges as well as their status as qualified donees; and ultimately the revocation of charitable registration. The Directorate has the power to revoke the status of registered charities if they fail to file annual information returns, fail to spend their resources primarily on public benefit purposes, engage in partisan political activities, issue false gift receipts, or make gifts to other registered charities conditional on gifts in kind.
The Charities Directorate auditing program is intended to maintain public confidence in registered charities. Beginning in the 2000s, the Charities Directorate has  increased its unofficial mandate to include education of charities on regulatory compliance although this is still minimal.

Information Collection
The main activity of the CRA is the collection of the T3010 annual information return which describes the activities of all registered charities over the year. The T3010 form also provides information to the public about registered charities' activities.
The T1236 form, Qualified Donees Worksheet, provides detailed information about the money given from one registered charity to another.

Information Publishing
As of 2019, the Canadian Revenue Agency website provides a search function to the public to check the status Canadian charities in order to help individuals' donation decision making. The contact information, activities, and financial information of all registered charities are available.
There has also been a wave of modernization through the use of open data as a means of accountability, published in 2018 in the report "OPENING CANADA’S T3010 CHARITY INFORMATION RETURN DATA".
As of 2013, the CRA has made efforts to be more transparent by making a data portal (https://open.canada.ca/en) available to Canadians, as a means for researchers to gather information on Canadian charities.

History and Recent Developments
In 1967, the first registration of charities with the government occurred through the Canadian Revenue Agency, this led to the creation of the branch that would later deal with the eligibility and regulation of registered charities.

On December 13, 2018, Bill C-86 received Royal Assent, which allows charities in the directorate to pursue political activities and policy-making as long as it is in line with the charities' purpose; except for direct or indirect action concerning political parties or public office candidates.

In 2013, the Director General released a statement giving an overview of how the Directorate works and recent statistics of efficiency. In 2014, the second update of the kind was released, covering new initiatives by the Directorate, along with an updated list of tools and statistics. In 2015, the last of these updates was posted. It presents an overview of legislative updates, auditing guidelines, specific limitations and staff changes.

In 2019, the CRA amended its definition of political activities; now only requesting if the organization had any public policy dialogue and development activities (PPDAs) and to explain them.
Recent controversy over the ability of U.S. donors to give to Canadian organizations could influence important crossborder issues, in particular oil pipelines, and has raised accusations of foreign intervention into Canadian affairs. Canadian federal tax legislation differentiates between Canadian nonprofit organizations and registered charities; Canadian nonprofit organizations (but not registered charities) can seek funding from US donors.

References

Sources
  ("OPENING CANADA’S T3010 CHARITY INFORMATION RETURN DATA Accountability of Charities through Open Data")

External links
 Charities and giving

Canadian taxation government bodies
Charity in Canada
Charity regulators